Bad Saarow (1950–2002: Bad Saarow-Pieskow) is a municipality in the Oder-Spree district, in Brandenburg, Germany.

The place is known for its hot springs and for its mineral-rich mud. Their healing properties have attracted visitors for many years, and in 1923 led to the town's name acquiring the prefix Bad ("bath", "spa").

Nearby are the Dubrower Berge, a range of wooded hills popular with hikers and cyclists.

Demography

Sons and daughters of the town 
 Jörg Schönbohm (1937−2019, born in Neu Golm), former Lieutenant general of the Bundeswehr, 1999−2009 Minister of the Interior of the State of Brandenburg
 Cornelia Ernst (born 1956), politician (The Left)
 Marienetta Jirkowsky (1962−1980), death at the Berlin Wall
 Axel Schulz (born 1968), boxer
 Vivien Kussatz (born 1972), sailor
 Isabel Cademartori (born 1988), politician (SPD)
 Franziska Mietzner (born 1988), handball player

References 

Localities in Oder-Spree
Spa towns in Germany